Pyeongwon of Goguryeo (ruled 559–590) the 25th ruler of Goguryeo, the northernmost of the Three Kingdoms of Korea. Pyeongwon was also known as 'Pyeonggangsanghowang'. His birth name was Yangseong (though the Suishu and Tangshu have him as Tang).

Reign
The years of Pyeongwon's rule are generally agreed upon by historians, but his year of birth has not been established with any degree of certainty. It is known that he was the eldest son of Yangwon of Goguryeo and became crown prince in 557, two years before assuming full power. He is said to have been courageous, and skilled in horseriding and archery.

By this time, royal power had been significantly eroded by the aristocracy. Concerned for the people, he encouraged agricultural and sericultural developments and reduced the royal cuisine.

He maintained tense but relatively peaceful relations with the Göktürks and the various Chinese dynasties, briefly battling the Northern Zhou at the Liaodong Peninsula in 577. He frequently sent tributes to the Chen Dynasty, Northern Qi, Northern Zhou and Sui Dynasty. As the Sui Dynasty united China, King Pyeongwon prepared for the impending war. 

The southern border with the other two Korean kingdoms was relatively peaceful as the Silla-Baekje alliance fell apart. In 586, he moved the capital to Jangan fortress.

In 590(32nd year of regin), the king received the news that the state of Chen had fallen and was greatly alarmed. For defense purposes he ordered troops into training and the augmentation of military provisions.

The rule of Pyeongwon came to an end in 590, which is the year of his death according to Samguk Sagi, but there is no specific documentation to confirm the circumstances. 

He was given the posthumous royal title of King Pyeongwon.

Family
Father: King Yangwon (양원왕, 陽原王)
Grandfather: King Anwon (안원왕, 安原王)
Grandmother: Middle Lady (중부인, 中夫人)
Unknown wife
Daughter: Princess Pyeonggang (평강공주, 平岡公主) – married On Dal (온달, 溫達).
1st son: Prince Won (원, 元)
2nd son: Prince Geonmu (건무, 建武)
3rd son: Prince Daeyang (대양, 大陽); father of King Bojang.

Popular culture
 Portrayed by Kil Yong-woo in the 2009 KBS2 TV series Invincible Lee Pyung Kang.
 Portrayed by Lee Yong-jik in the 2017 Netflix TV series My Only Love Song.

See also
History of Korea
List of Korean monarchs
On Dal

References

Goguryeo rulers
6th-century births
6th-century monarchs in Asia
Year of birth unknown
Place of birth unknown
Year of death unknown
Place of death unknown
6th-century Korean people